Ferenc Gebauer (25 June 1888–1958) was an Austrian-born Hungarian firearms designer and pilot during the First World War.

Early life and career 
Gebauer was born as Franz Gebauer on 25 June 1888 in Velké Heraltice | (Groß Herrlitz in German) in Austria-Hungary to Wawra Józefa. From 1901 to 1911 he worked as a plant manager for a car factory in Germany, then went to work for the Puch motorcycle factory in Graz, Austria from 1911 to 1914. He served in World War I in the Austro-Hungarian Air Force (KuK Luftfahrtruppen) as a car courier officer of the army headquarters (August 21, 1914 to March 1915), a field pilot on the Italian front from May 25, 1916 to September 3, 1917, a factory pilot at the Aspern Phönix Flugzeugwerke aircraft factory from September 3, 1917 to September 1918 and finally served as a gunsmith at the Fischamend Air Base in 1918 until the war ended.

In 1920 he worked, in an unofficial capacity, for the Technical Experimental Weapon Division of the Royal Hungarian Honvéd, tasked with developing weapons in secret from the Allied forces. In 1924, Gebauer went to work for Danuvia until 1936. He became a citizen of Hungary and changed his name from the German Franz to the Hungarian Ferenc on February 17, 1930. He worked for the József Nádor University of Technology and Economics (now Budapest University of Technology and Economics) starting in 1939, but was forced to flee from Austria during the German occupation of Hungary.  In March 1944, with the invasion of Hungary by the USSR, Gebauer fled to Sweden to work for Bofors, where he worked as the chief designer of the Bofors arms factory until his death in 1958.

He was awarded the following medals during his lifetime:

 Knight's Cross of the Hungarian Order of Merit
 Hungarian Crown Bronze Medal on an emerald green ribbon
 Silver Medal of Valor, First Class
 Silver Valor Medal, Second Class (Awarded twice)
 Károly Team Cross
 Camp Pilot Badge
 Knight's Cross of the Order of the Italian Crown

Firearms design 
Noting that the model 07/12 Schwarzlose machine gun was prone to freezing up in the higher altitudes above the Italian Alps, Gebauer decided that the current practice of adapting standard infantry machine guns was outmoded, as the propeller synchronization only controlled the timing, and not the operation, of these weapons. He decided that an aircraft machine gun needed to fire based on the propeller shaft so it was not dependent upon gas-operation. Colonel Uzelac of the K.u.K. Luftfahrtruppen – Fliegerarsenal (Austro-Hungarian Aviation Troops) was impressed by the inventor's ideas and pushed through plans for three prototypes to be created over four months. Trials started in 1917, and in June 1918 the test pilots gave favorable results to the third prototype. This resulted in the creation of the Gebauer Machine Gun 1918.M (GMP 1918.M), of which 100 (later 500) were ordered from the Öfam-Sollux Company. While the 1918.M was developed too late for practical use in World War I, was tested on various types of aircraft, including the Albatros D.III, Halberstadt D.II, Fokker D.VII, and WKF D.I. The 1918.M led to further designs and refinement, eventually culminating in the Gebauer GKM Machine Gun 1940.M. Gebauer held 20 firearm patents, some in his name and others with Danuvia.

Notable weapons

References 

1888 births
1958 deaths
Gunsmiths
People from Opava District